Arda Akbulut (born 1 January 2001) is a Turkish professional footballer who plays for Adanaspor on loan from Trabzonspor as a goalkeeper.

Career

Club
On 19 December 2018, Akbulut made his debut for Trabzonspor against Sivas Belediye Spor in 5th round encounter of 2018–19 Turkish Cup where he earned a clean sheet, following the final score of 5–0. On 10 February 2019, Akbulut made his Süper Lig debut at week 21 encounter of 2018-19 season against Galatasaray which ended 3–1 in favour of Galatasaray.

On 12 January 2023, Akbulut moved on a 1.5-year loan to Adanaspor.

Honours
Trabzonspor
Turkish Cup: 2019–20
Süper Lig: 2021–22

References

External links
 

2001 births
Sportspeople from Trabzon
Living people
Turkish footballers
Turkey youth international footballers
Association football goalkeepers
Trabzonspor footballers
Bandırmaspor footballers
Adanaspor footballers
Süper Lig players